Philip Jacob Rodrian (November 6, 1845 – May 12, 1915) was an American farmer and politician.

Born in Fuerfeld, Hesse Darmstadt, Germany, Rodrian emigrated to the United States with his parents, in 1869, and settled in Hartford, Wisconsin. In 1871, Rodrian moved to the town of Ahnapee, Kewaunee County, Wisconsin and settled on a farm. Rodrian served as Anhapee town treasurer and assessor. Rodrian was active in the Democratic Party. In 1895, Rodrian served in the Wisconsin State Assembly. In 1914, Rodrian and his wife moved to Algoma, Wisconsin. Rodrian died of cancer at his home in Algoma, Wisconsin.

Notes

1845 births
1915 deaths
German emigrants to the United States
People from Ahnapee, Wisconsin
Farmers from Wisconsin
19th-century American politicians
People from Hartford, Wisconsin
People from Algoma, Wisconsin
Democratic Party members of the Wisconsin State Assembly